Njaan (English: "I") is a 2014 Indian Malayalam-language period drama film directed by Ranjith with Dulquer Salmaan in the lead role, along with Jyothi Krishna, Anumol and newcomer Shruthi Ramachandran as the female leads. The movie is based on the novel K T N Kottur Ezhuthum Jeevithavum by T. P. Rajeevan, which is set in the backdrop of India's freedom struggle and depicts history of a Kerala village. The film released on 19 September 2014.

Plot
Ravi Chandrasekharan is a young blogger who has a keen interest in the life of KTN Kottur - a writer, poet and revolutionary freedom fighter. Ravi, being involved actively in theatre and arts, expresses his wish to recreate the story of KTN Kottur on stage rather than make it a book. To explore the different shades and the mysteries surrounding the character, he arrives at Kottur to learn the intricacies of the person.

After reaching Kottur, Ravi finds it strange to adapt to the surroundings, he attends the cultural village fares and also learns about their customs. Ravi Chandrasekharan in an attempt to know about KTN also understands the customs of people living there are weird too. One such incident is where he wakes up abruptly in the middle of the night covering his mouth because of nausea. Some bad odour gives Ravi a vomiting sensation & he checks around but finds nothing. The next morning, he finds ashes of a dead creature & realises that this was the bad odour which made him uncomfortable & from then as he encounters the twists in the life of KTN Kottur and the mystery surrounding his disappearance on the day India won her Independence makes up the story.

Cast
 Dulquer Salmaan as K. T. N Kottoor and Ravi Chandrasekhar
 Saiju Kurup as V. P. Kunjikannan
 Suresh Krishna as Achan
 Hareesh Peradi as Nakulan
 Anumol as Janu
 Sajitha Madathil as Kurathi Kunjooli
 Renji Panicker as Kuttysankaran
 Muthumani as valliamma
 Jyothi Krishna as Lakshmikkutty
 Shruthi Ramachandran as Susheela
 Irshad
 Joy Mathew as himself
 Pearle Maaney as Valli
 Mythili as Devayaniyamma (Devu)
  Chinnu Kuruvila
 Jayan Cherthala
 Bineesh Kodiyeri
 Koottickal Jayachandran
Mohammed musthafa as raghavan

Production
It was the first time Ranjith and Dulquar joined hands for a film. The first teaser of the film released on 12 June 2014 followed by the second on 17 June.

Awards and nominations
 2014 Kerala State Film Awards

It received two Kerala State Awards.

Asiavision Awards - 2014
It received Asiavision Awards 2014 - award for best direction and screen play.

References

External links
 

2014 films
2010s Malayalam-language films
Films directed by Ranjith